The 2009–10 Cymru Alliance season began on Friday 14 August 2009 and ended on Saturday 8 May 2010. The league was won by Llangefni Town.

Team changes from 2008–09
Bala Town as 2008–09 Champions were promoted to the Welsh Premier League with Caernarfon Town replacing them.

Berriew were promoted from Mid Wales League, Bethesda Athletic were promoted from the Welsh Alliance League and Llangollen Town were promoted from the Welsh National League.

Llandyrnog United were relegated to the Welsh Alliance League.

Mynydd Isa and Glantraeth both resigned from the league.

League table

Results

References

External links
 Cymru Alliance

Cymru Alliance seasons
2009–10 in Welsh football leagues